The flag of Acadiana represents the Acadian (Cajun) ethnic region of southern Louisiana. It consists of two equal horizontal bands of blue (top) and red (bottom) bearing three white fleurs de lis and a gold castle, respectively, and a white isosceles triangle at the hoist, within which is a gold five-pointed star. It was designed in 1965 and officially adopted July 5, 1974. The flag is referred to as the Acadiana flag or Cajun flag.

History
The flag was designed in 1965 by Dr. Thomas J. Arceneaux of the University of Southwestern Louisiana (present day University of Louisiana at Lafayette), who derived it from the Southwestern Louisiana Institute seal. He was an early proponent of the Louisiana French Renaissance Movement, a movement designed to renew interest and pride in the French-Acadian heritage, language, and culture of Louisiana. On July 5, 1974, the State Legislature passed House Concurrent Resolution No. 143 adopting Dr. Arceneaux's design as the official flag of Acadiana.

Symbolism
The various symbols on the flag were each chosen to represent a special aspect of Cajun culture and history. The golden star surrounded by a field of white serves as a symbol of Acadian exiles in America and alludes to their Roman Catholic heritage. The fleurs de lis set against a background of blue represent the French ancestry of the Cajuns. The golden castle set upon a field of red represents Spanish colonial rule of Louisiana, the rule during which the exiled Acadians arrived.

See also
 List of flags by design
 Flag of Acadia

References

External links

 
 

1974 establishments in Louisiana
Flag
Flag
Ethnic flags
Flags introduced in 1965
Flags of Louisiana
Louisiana culture